White stuff may refer to:
 The White Stuff, a song by Weird Al Yankovic
 White Stuff Clothing, a retail chain 
 White Stuff (album), a 2019 album by Royal Trux